Chen Kuan-jen (born 15 April 1982 in Taiwan) is a Taiwanese professional baseball player who is currently a free agent.

Career
In 2006 season, as a rookie, he gained the Batting Championship Award and Chinese Professional Baseball League Rookie of the Year. He played for the Brother Elephants (now the Chinatrust Brothers) of the Chinese Professional Baseball League, as well as the Lamigo Monkeys.

In 2016, he played for the Southern Maryland Blue Crabs of the Atlantic League of Professional Baseball.

In late 2017, he signed on as a mid-season addition for the Adelaide Bite of the Australian Baseball League.

Career statistics

Awards
 Chinese Professional Baseball League Home run Derby Winner (2005)
 Chinese Professional Baseball League Rookie of the Year Award (2006)
 Chinese Professional Baseball League Batting Champion Award (2006)
 Chinese Professional Baseball League Hits Champion Award (2008)

See also
 Chinese Professional Baseball League
 Brother Elephants

References

External links
 

1982 births
Living people
Adelaide Bite players
Baseball outfielders
Brother Elephants players
Lamigo Monkeys players
People from Yunlin County
Taiwanese expatriate baseball players in Australia